Ghost Dance were a British gothic rock and post-punk band formed in 1985 by Gary Marx (ex-Sisters of Mercy guitarist) and Anne-Marie Hurst (ex-Skeletal Family vocalist) as both were leaving their respective bands. The band were originally signed to Nick Jones' record label, Karbon Records, then were later signed to the major label Chrysalis Records, before splitting up in 1989.  In 2019, the band reformed with Anne-Marie Hurst being joined by new members, Tim Walker - guitar, Stephen Derrig - guitar, Phil Noble - bass, Dave Wood - drums and began work on new material. Reunion shows followed in the UK and the band signed to Voltage Records for a new album release in 2022

Members
 Gary Marx – guitars (1985–1989)
 Anne-Marie Hurst – vocals (1985–1989, 2019 - present)
 Paul "Etch" Etchells – bass (1985–1989)
 Steve Smith – guitars (1985–1986)
 Richard Steel – guitars (1986–1989)
 John Grant – drums (1986–1989)
 Tim Walker – guitar (2019 - present)
 Dave Wood – drums (2019 - present)
 Phil Noble – bass (2019 - present)
 Stephen Derrig – guitar (2020 - present)

History

"River of No Return"
Bassist Paul Etchells was hired, and with a drum machine nicknamed 'Pandora', the band set about releasing their debut 12" single, "River of No Return", featuring a cover of Roxy Music's song "Both Ends Burning". By Marx's own admission, the sound quality was poor. Nevertheless, the single was released in early 1986.

"Heart Full of Soul"
The second single to be released was "Heart Full of Soul", a cover of The Yardbirds' song. It was backed with a cover of Golden Earring's hit single "Radar Love". The 12" version of the single had a silver sleeve instead of the pale blue of the 7" single, as well as a bonus track on the A-side, a cover of Suzi Quatro's "Can The Can".

Steve Smith from Red Lorry Yellow Lorry had been helping the band live and occasionally in the studio, and on this single, contributed by adding backing vocals and extra guitars. After recording this single, he played some more gigs, until his final one in Wolverhampton, when he left the band to concentrate on his own project, Riprize.

The drums on this single were programmed by Etch, rather than Marx.

"The Grip of Love"
"The Grip of Love" was the third single by Ghost Dance to be released in 1986. With the departure of Steve Smith, new guitarist Richard Steel played on this single. The 7" single A-side was "The Grip of Love (Bombay Mix)", and the B-side was "Where Spirits Fly". The 12" single omitted "Where Spirits Fly", and added "Last Train" to the A-side, and "A Deeper Blue" and "The Grip of Love (A Cheaper Blues Version)" to the B-side. All the tracks on the 12" version are in the key of D minor, hence the subtitle to the single "Suite in D Minor". The single's producer, Richard Mazda, also played harmonica on the "Cheaper Blues Version".

Leaving Karbon
In 1987, Ghost Dance released their final Karbon EP, A Word to the Wise. They had recruited drummer John Grant, with Daniel Mass from ex-Merciful Release band Salvation providing backing vocals on the A-side track "When I Call". This track was recorded in Amazon Studios, proving to be the most financially demanding track the band had recorded. Nevertheless, it was one of the first tracks the band had written.

The second A-side track was "Fools Gold" (written by Etch, one of the few tracks in Ghost Dance's discography not written by Marx), and the two B-sides were "Cruel Light" and "Holding On". Despite the success of "A Word to the Wise", the band had reached the end of their time with Karbon Records. The final release on Karbon was Gathering Dust, a compilation album of all the singles they had released to date. After leaving Karbon, their tour manager Simon "Sparky" Parker became their manager, and succeeded in securing Ghost Dance a recording contract with Chrysalis Records.

Chrysalis Records
The first release on Chrysalis was the single "Down to the Wire", which peaked at No. 66 in the UK Singles Chart in June 1989. The various issues of the singles included a live "Gathering Dust Medley" for the B-side. This was a live recording of "The Grip of Love" / "Last Train" / "Celebrate". A promotional German release of this single was released as 'Introducing Ghost Dance'. The band released their debut album, Stop the World (some copies coming with a bonus live 12" single), despite the tensions in the band growing. The label had wanted a re-recording of the early song "Celebrate", to be a new single, despite the label ignoring the fact that there had been a version of "Celebrate" on the B-side of the previous single.

The single's reception was "disastrous", and despite demoing new songs, such as "Rock It" and "Adrift Without You" with new manager Chris Cooke, the band slowly disintegrated, playing their final concert in Amsterdam, on 4 December 1989.

1990–present
As of 2009, Hurst had returned to music, potentially playing old Ghost Dance songs.

Marx was in contact with Andrew Eldritch in 1995, and wrote several tracks for a studio collaboration, but never heard from Eldritch again. In 2005, Marx released the tracks as the album 1995 and Nowhere. He has also released his own debut album Pretty Black Dots and attempted to reissue Gathering Dust as a remastered CD-R, but it was soon withdrawn.

Copies of Ghost Dance releases are no longer available. Stop the World occasionally appears on eBay, with the comparably scarcer CD issue often selling for over £40 (the exception is the reissue from Cherry Red Records can still be purchased direct, at retail price).

The official Ghost Dance website contains several mp3s of unreleased and rare songs, with extra tracks for forum members.

In 2019 Hurst formed a new version of Ghost Dance with ex-Harlequyn members Tim Walker, Dave Wood and Phil Noble - joined later by Stephen Derrig of Original Sin. All four new members played several gigs as support to the original Ghost Dance line-up in the late 1980's. The new Ghost Dance signed to Voltage Records for an album release in 2022.

Discography

References

External links
 Ghost Dance official website
 Gary Marx official website 
 Ghost Dance 2021 official website

English gothic rock groups
Post-punk groups from Leeds
Death rock groups
Female-fronted musical groups
Musical groups established in 1985
Musical groups disestablished in 1989
Chrysalis Records artists
1985 establishments in England